Gunisao Lake Water Aerodrome  is located on Gunisao Lake, Manitoba, Canada.

See also
Gunisao Lake Airport

References

Registered aerodromes in Manitoba
Seaplane bases in Manitoba